Simon Allan Stainrod (born 1 February 1959) is an English former professional footballer who played as a striker for Sheffield United, Oldham Athletic, Queens Park Rangers, Sheffield Wednesday, Aston Villa and Stoke City. He also played in France for RC Strasbourg and FC Rouen and in Scotland for Falkirk, Dundee and Ayr United.

Career
Stainrod was born in Sheffield and began his career with Sheffield United making his debut towards the end of the 1975–76, he scored twice in seven matches as the Blades suffered relegation to the Second Division. He spent four season at Bramall Lane making 75 appearances scoring 14 goals before he moved to Oldham Athletic in Match 1979. It was at Boundary Park that Stainrod began to make a name for himself scoring 26 goals in 79 appearances which attracted the attentions of Chelsea and Queens Park Rangers. He decided to join Terry Venables' QPR in November 1980 for a fee of £270,000.

In the 1981–82 season he was a key player of the team that reached the 1982 FA Cup Final, losing 1–0 to Tottenham Hotspur after a replay, Stainrod scored a career best of 24 goals that season. In 1982–83 he helped the team win the Second Division title and then finish fifth in the First Division qualifying for Europe. After Venables left Loftus Road in 1984 for Barcelona, the side quickly fell apart under the unsuccessful reign of Alan Mullery and many players including Stainrod left the club.

Stainrod then had an unsuccessful spell at Sheffield Wednesday, and was sold to Aston Villa for £350,000 in September 1985 and he enjoyed a spectacular debut when he scored all four goals against Exeter City in the League Cup. Despite scoring 21 goals for Villa in 1985–86 he struggled to get in the team in 1986–87 and the team were relegated to the Second Division. In January 1988 he joined Mick Mills' Stoke City where he scored twice in 16 appearances in 1987–88. In 1988–89 Stainrod score five goals in 18 appearances before moving to France.

He spent the 1988–89 season in France with RC Strasbourg (eight appearances, two goals). He then spent a further spell with FC Rouen (22 appearances, 1 goal) before moving to Scotland to play for Falkirk and Ayr United and then managing Dundee in Scotland. During Stainrod's spell at Falkirk he famously scored from the halfway line against St Johnstone direct from a kick off.

Post playing career
He is also a FIFA-licensed football agent and is now based in Cannes, France. In 2003, he set up his own company with a couple of his friends called Matchday Media. Stainrod was working with Hatem Ben Arfa following his move to Newcastle United as his adviser.

Career statistics

Honours
Queens Park Rangers
 Football League Second Division: 1982–83
 FA Cup runner-up: 1982

Aston Villa
 Football League Second Division runner-up: 1987–88

Falkirk
 Scottish Football League First Division: 1990–91

References

External links
 

1959 births
Footballers from Sheffield
Living people
Association football forwards
English footballers
English expatriate footballers
Expatriate footballers in France
Sheffield United F.C. players
Oldham Athletic A.F.C. players
Queens Park Rangers F.C. players
Sheffield Wednesday F.C. players
Aston Villa F.C. players
Stoke City F.C. players
RC Strasbourg Alsace players
Falkirk F.C. players
Dundee F.C. players
Ayr United F.C. players
English Football League players
Ligue 1 players
Scottish Football League players
English football managers
Dundee F.C. managers
Ayr United F.C. managers
Scottish Football League managers
Association football player-managers
FA Cup Final players